Black president may refer to:

Politics

United States 
 Barack Obama, first African-American president of the United States
 African-American candidates for President of the United States
 African-American heritage of presidents of the United States, including unsubstantiated rumors
 African-American presidents of the United States in popular culture

Elsewhere 
Some nations which give the title "President" to their heads of state or of government (especially in sub-Saharan Africa and the Caribbean) have had numerous Black presidents.
 Nelson Mandela, the first black President of South Africa

Music 
 Black President (band), an American punk rock group
 Black President (Black President album), 2008
 Black President (Brenda Fassie album), 1990
 "Black President" (song), the title song
 Black President, an album by Fela Kuti, 1981
 "Black President", a song by Nas from his untitled album, 2008

See also
 O Presidente Negro (lit. The Black President), a 1926 novel by Monteiro Lobato